Dollars and Sex is the third album by rock band The Escape Club, released in 1991. It includes the singles, "Call It Poison" and "I'll Be There" – the latter of which reached no. 8 on the Billboard Hot 100.

Track listing
 "The Edge of Your Bed"
 "Call It Poison"
 "So Fashionable"
 "I'll Be There"
 "Shout the Walls Down"
 "This City"
 "Blast off to Heaven"
 "Freedom"
 "Sugar Man"
 "Come Alive"

References 

1991 albums
The Escape Club albums
Albums produced by Peter Wolf
Atlantic Records albums